Ashurbay (also Romanized as Āshūrbāy) is a village in Shirang Rural District, Kamalan District, Aliabad County, Golestan Province, Iran. At the 2006 census, its population was 958, in 221 families.

References 

Populated places in Aliabad County